Thropton is a hamlet in Northumberland, England, located on the River Coquet, and its tributary Wreigh Burn. In the hamlet is a stone bridge over the Wreigh Burn which was built in 1811. Thropton is on the edge of Northumberland National Park, and the surrounding area north and south of the hamlet consists of haughs, and also to the south on the opppisite side of the Coquet lies Simonside Hills, a hill range that has many crags dotted along it.

Amenities
The post office closed in approximately 2018, likewise the small village shop in which it was located, and the adjacent vehicle repair garage also closed - as at November 2020 the land is currently vacant. In November 2022 a SPAR opened in Thropton, the shop has a floor area of 3,000 sq. ft. and has a four-pump forecourt operated by Shell. The neon Shell sign has caused a row over light pollution due to Thropton being on the edge of Northumberland National Park which is a dark-sky preserve, however a poll on a community Facebook page  showed that 98%  to 99%  of residents did not think the sign was a problem . The row has been reported by the national media, including an article in The Telegraph  and a mention on Jeremy Vine.  Thropton has two pubs: the Cross Keys and the Three Wheat Heads, a 300-year-old coaching inn.

Landmarks 
A little over a mile to the south of the village are the ruins of Great Tosson Tower, a pele tower probably built in the late fifteenth century and later used as part of a system of watch towers designed to curb the activities of the Border Reivers. A short distance from Great Tosson is Tosson lime kiln, designed by architect George Reavell in 1888, disused and restored in appearance by Northumberland National Park Authority. The site has a small car park and picnic site, and has fine views across the valley to Thropton main village and Rothbury. An information board at the site relates how a cow once fell down inside it.

Geography 
Thropton has the B6431 running though, with the majority of the hamlet based along the road. Thropton also had two C roads, the C176 road from Thropton to Netherton via Snitter connects to the B6341, and is connected to the C178 running from Thropton to Whittingham via Cartington.

Culture 
On the third Saturday in September Thropton holds its annual village show. The show is in field on next to the junction of the C176 road from Thropton to Snitter, and the C178 from Thropton to Cartington. leading from Thropton to Netherton. Alongside local trade and craft stalls, the show also has a Northumbrian pipe band, and fell race where runners run to and up the Simonside Hills and back. The village show started in 1915 and 2015 the centenary was celebrated.

Transport 
Thropton is the terminus for the X14 Thropton - Rothbury - Morpeth bus which is a lifeline to the rural community, with many services continuing towards Newcastle upon Tyne. It is currently operated by Arriva Northumbria and was formerly operated by Go North East.

References

Villages in Northumberland